Thurston Community College is a co-educational secondary school and sixth form located in Thurston, Suffolk, England. As of 2018, it has 1,733 students aged 11–18 drawn from the local village and surrounding rural communities.

History
Thn Community College was founded in 1973, and was originally known as Thurston Upper School.

Transition to two-tier education structure 
In September 2014, the school underwent a large transition in order to become a secondary school and follow the two-tier education structure. Because of this, the Thurston Sixth Form Centre was relocated to Beyton, on the site of the former Beyton Middle School, and is now known as Thurston Sixth: Beyton Campus. This also meant that the most junior year group was lowered from Year 9 to Year 7. The old Sixth Form Centre, now a humanities department, was opened in 2002 by Rt Hon David Puttnam.

The college today
The school's facilities include a community library, a large sixth form centre (based in Beyton) and an Air Training Corps building. It has a total staff of around 170. In its most recent Ofsted inspection report in 2018, the school was rated Good. The school has been rated Good every inspection except for in 2010 when the school was rated outstanding.

Houses 
Until 2020, the school was divided into five houses, named after famous British people with Suffolk connections. The school has changed these houses into year group blocks.

 Gainsborough 
 Rendell
 Anderson
 Penrose
 Wolsey

Principals 

?–2005 Chris Bowler

2005–2021 Helen Wilson

2021–present Nicki Mattin (formerly head teacher of Spires Academy, Canterbury)

Notable former pupils

 Kate Smurthwaite, comedian
Kate Quilton, television presenter and journalist
 Prof. Daniel Wakelin, Jeremy Griffiths Professor of Medieval English Palaeography since 2011 at St Hilda's College, Oxford
 Prof. Adrian Simpson, Principal of St Mary's College and founding Principal of Josephine Butler College at Durham University
 Gary Stevens, footballer for Tottenham Hotspur FC
 James Scowcroft, footballer for Ipswich Town FC
 Jo Jennings, represented Great Britain and England at high jump

References

External sources
Thurston Community College website
Thurston Community College description on The Good Schools Guide

Community schools in Suffolk
Secondary schools in Suffolk